Clemens Berger (born 20 May 1979, in Güssing) is an Austrian writer. Since 2017 he is a contributor and co-editor of Versopolis, The European Review of Poetry, Books and Culture, a pan-European online literary magazine.

He grew up in Oberwart and studied philosophy and publicity in Vienna, where he currently lives.

Works 
Der gehängte Mönch (2003)
Paul Beers Beweis (2005)
Die Wettesser (2007)
Gatsch / Und Jetzt. Zwei Stücke (2009)
Und hieb ihm das rechte Ohr ab (2009)
Das Streichelinstitut (2010)
Engel der Armen (2011)
Im Jahr des Panda (2016)

References

External links

 

1979 births
Living people
Austrian male writers